Redemption Rock is a colonial-era historic site in Princeton, Massachusetts. In 1676, during King Philip's War,  the release of Mary Rowlandson (the wife of a Puritan minister) from her Native American captors was negotiated atop a granite ledge. The  parcel upon which the rock stands was acquired by the land conservation non-profit organization The Trustees of Reservations in 1953, and is open to the public.

Rowlandson would later write about her experience in A Narrative of the Captivity and Restoration of Mrs. Mary Rowlandson, considered a seminal work in the American literary genre of captivity narratives.

Redemption Rock is located off Massachusetts Route 140, near Wachusett Mountain.

Inscriptions and markers

The inscription on Redemption Rock reads: Upon this rock May 2, 1676 was made the agreement for the ransom of Mrs Mary Rowlandson of Lancaster between the Indians and John Hoar of Concord. King Philip was with the Indians but refused his consent.

The official state marker at the site, placed in 1930, reads: Upon the rock fifty feet West of this spot Mary Rowlandson wife of the first minister of Lancaster was redeemed from captivity under King Philip. The narrative of her experience is one of the classics of colonial literature.

Recreation
The Midstate Trail passes by Redemption Rock.  Wachusett Mountain State Reservation is 1.2 miles south along the trail. The Crow Hills in Leominster State Forest are 1.6 miles north along the trail.

References

External links
The Trustees of Reservations.org: Redemption Rock

Rock formations of Massachusetts
Landforms of Worcester County, Massachusetts
Princeton, Massachusetts
Open space reserves of Massachusetts
Native American history of Massachusetts
Pre-statehood history of Massachusetts
Protected areas of Worcester County, Massachusetts
The Trustees of Reservations
1953 establishments in Massachusetts
Protected areas established in 1953